Henry Woods (18 December 1868, in Cottenham – 4 April 1952, in Meldreth) was a British paleontologist.

In 1890 Woods earned a B.A. from the University of Cambridge, then became there curator of the Woodwardian Museum, earning an M.A. in 1894. In 1895 he won the Sedgwick prize. At Cambridge University, Woods was from 1892 to 1899 a demonstrator in paleobotany, and from 1894 to 1899 a demonstrator in paleozoology until his promotion to lecturer. From 1899 until his retirement in 1934 he was a lecturer in paleontology at Cambridge. In 1910 he married paleontologist Ethel Skeat, the daughter of Walter William Skeat, professor of Anglo-Saxon. Even after his retirement, Woods remained at the university as a librarian for the paleontology department until he was over eighty.

In 1940 Woods received the Wollaston Medal and in 1918 the Lyell Medal. He was elected a Fellow of the Royal Society in 1916.

He is buried at the Parish of the Ascension Burial Ground in Cambridge; his wife is buried with him.

Works
 Palaentology, invertebrate, Cambridge University Press, 7th edn. 1937, Online (1st edn. 1893)
 Elementary Palaentology for geology students, Cambridge University Press 1893
 Catalogue of the Type Fossils in the Woodwardian Museum, Cambridge, Cambridge 2010 (1st edn. 1891)
 Trilobita and Eurypterida, in Sidney Harmer et al. Cambridge Natural History, vol. 4, 1909

References

External links
 Brief biography
 

British palaeontologists
Alumni of St John's College, Cambridge
English curators
Fellows of the Royal Society
Lyell Medal winners
Wollaston Medal winners
1868 births
1952 deaths
People from Cottenham
People from South Cambridgeshire District